Nargedia is a monotypic genus of plant in the family Rubiaceae. It has only one species, Nargedia macrocarpa, endemic to Sri Lanka.

References 

Octotropideae
Rubiaceae genera
Taxa named by Richard Henry Beddome
Taxonomy articles created by Polbot